This is a list of episodes of the 2009 Japanese animated television series White Album, based on the visual novel of the same name by Leaf. The episodes, produced by Seven Arcs, are directed by Akira Yoshimura, written by Hiroaki Satō, and features character design by Kō Yoshinari based on the original concept provided by Hisashi Kawata. The story follows Tōya Fujii, a college student, and his relationship with his romantic interest and idol singer Yuki Morikawa, as well as his interactions with Yuki's senior, Rina Ogata. The first thirteen episodes began its broadcast on January 3, 2009 on TV Kanagawa Japanese television network, and is set to conclude on March 28, 2009. A second set of thirteen episodes was broadcast in Fall 2009. The episodes were also aired on later dates on TV Saitama, Chiba TV, KBS Kyoto, Nagoya Broadcasting Network, and the AT-X broadcasting networks.

Nine pieces of theme music were used for the episodes; two opening themes (also used as special endings), two ending themes and five insert songs. The insert songs are:
"Garasu no Hana" (ガラスの華) by Nana Mizuki (ep 3), "Koiirozora" (恋色空) by Aya Hirano (ep 24), "POWDER SNOW" by Nana Mizuki & Aya Hirano (ep 26), "SOUND OF DESTINY" by Nana Mizuki and "WHITE ALBUM" by Aya Hirano. A single for the first opening theme was released on January 21, 2009, and a single for the first ending theme was released on January 28, 2009.


Episode list

References

External links
Official White Album anime website 

White Album